Amsterdam University College (AUC) is a public liberal arts college in the Netherlands with an enrollment of about 900 students from more than 60 countries. All teaching is in English.

The college was founded in 2009 as a joint initiative of the University of Amsterdam and the VU Amsterdam with a particular focus on the natural sciences. Although AUC has its own campus, students can also use facilities of both parent universities. The college is part of a recent wave of university colleges in the Netherlands which have introduced liberal arts education to the country.

AUC offers Bachelor of Arts degrees in the social sciences and humanities and a Bachelor of Science degree in science, which are pursued by about 50%, 15%, and 33% of the student body, respectively. The curriculum is strongly interdisciplinary; within each field, students have to pursue at least two disciplines. AUC further emphasizes its 'academic core', which makes up a large part of the curriculum.

History
The foundation of AUC goes back to an initiative of the two large universities in Amsterdam, University of Amsterdam (UvA) and Vrije Universiteit Amsterdam (VU), as well as the municipality. It is part of an initiative to make Amsterdam a hub for research and development in the natural sciences.

AUC was officially founded in 2008, and took up operation with its founding class in 2009. The first dean of the college is Prof. Dr. Marijk van der Wende, Professor of Higher Education at the VU. The first class of graduates received their diplomas in 2012. In 2016, van der Wende was succeeded as AUC dean by Prof. Murray Pratt.

Academics

Reputation
In the 2016 Keuzegids Universiteiten, AUC earned a designation as top-rated programme based on student ratings and evaluations by the Accreditation Organisation of the Netherlands and Flanders (NVAO). In the 2015 Nationale Studentenquête, AUC received a high rating of 4.3 out of 5, placing it among the best programmes at the University of Amsterdam and in the country.

Students at Amsterdam University College receive a joint degree from the University of Amsterdam and the VU University. The University of Amsterdam regularly ranks among the best 100 universities in the world (2015/16 QS World University Rankings: 56).

Academic programme
AUC offers a three-year honours degree in three very broad majors in science, social sciences, and humanities. During the academic year 2013/14, students could choose between approximately 200 courses across eight fields in the sciences, nine in the social sciences, seven in the humanities, as well as the academic core. As part of AUC's interdisciplinary orientation, students have to pursue 'tracks' in at least two fields within their major. Interdisciplinarity is also emphasized by AUC's themes, which link fields across majors.

The college emphasizes a strong academic core, which includes academic writing and basic calculus or statistics, but also more unusual courses such as logic or 'identity and diversity', which are compulsory for students of all majors. Furthermore, students are required to take two to three language courses; in 2013/14, the languages offered were Arabic, Dutch, French, German, and Spanish.

AUC has branded itself as a 'science college', and places particular emphasis on the natural sciences. In 2013/14, courses were offered in eight 'tracks': information sciences, mathematics, physics, earth and environmental sciences, chemistry, biology, biomedical sciences, and health.  Although during the first years less than 35% of students were majoring in the sciences, this number is expected to rise to 50% in the future.

While teachers for many core and introductory courses are employed by AUC directly, the college draws on its parent institutions for most of its lecturers.

Graduates receive a joint degree from the University of Amsterdam and VU University; a Bachelor of Arts in the social sciences or humanities or a Bachelor of Science in science. Students graduation with a cumulative GPA of 3.0 or higher receive an honours degree. Cum laude degrees are awarded for graduation with a GPA of 3.5 or higher, and summa cum laude degrees for a 3.9 or higher.

Study abroad

Around a third of all students spend a semester abroad during their studies at AUC. The college has a number of partners on its own, but students can also apply to the exchange partners of UvA and VU on all continents.

Admissions
In 2010, AUC admitted 200 of about 900 applicants for its class of 2013. The maximum number of admissions per year is 300. The average grade of admitted students in the Dutch system was 7.6, the highest of all Dutch university colleges that publish such information. Unusual for a European public university, AUC's application procedure includes an individual essay, motivation letter, and interview. In a country where access to most courses of study is unrestricted, this gives the college unusual freedoms to select its students. AUC in particular takes into account international experience.

Tuition and scholarships
As of the academic year of 2012/13, the tuition fee amounts to 3,901 Euro for Dutch and EU/EEA students and 11,491 Euro for all other international students.

The law "ruim baan voor talent",  passed in 2011, allows some public universities to ask higher tuition fees from their students. For programs that offer services beyond regular standards, universities are allowed to charge more than the regular tuition fees (1771 Euro in 2012/13). AUC has been awarded the "Distinctive feature of small-scale and intensive education" by the Dutch-Flemish Accreditation Council (NVAO) required under the law.

Scholarship fund
About 15% of students are supported by the AUC scholarship fund. The fund awards full scholarships of 5,000 Euro for Dutch/EU/EEA and 15,000 Euro for international students, as well as partial scholarships up to half the amount. In addition, the Diversity Award Programme of the AUC scholarship fund provides scholarships specifically for Dutch minority students, with the aim to increase the diversity of the student body.

The AUC Scholarship Fund is supported by VU, UvA, and the Amsterdam University College Student Association; as well as a range of corporate sponsors. The latter include Rabobank, Royal Dutch Shell, Schiphol Group, Akzo Nobel, KLM, and PricewaterhouseCoopers.

Accreditation
The AUC programme is a fully accredited joint bachelor programme of the VU University Amsterdam and the University of Amsterdam (UvA). The Dutch government allocates responsibility for accreditation to the NVAO (the Accreditation Organisation of the Netherlands and Flanders). The AUC programme was accredited by the NVAO on 2 September 2008. Upon successful completion of the programme students receive a joint Bachelor honours degree from the VU University Amsterdam and University of Amsterdam (UvA) and the title Bachelor of Arts (BA) or Bachelor of Science (BSc).

AUC has been awarded the "Distinctive feature of small-scale and intensive education" by the Dutch-Flemish Accreditation Council (NVAO), which is required from Dutch institutes of higher education for raising tuition fees beyond the national standard.

Campus and location

AUC is a residential college with a campus in the Science Park. It is located in the borough of Amsterdam-Oost, in what was formerly the borough of Watergraafsmeer. The campus houses an academic building, completed in 2012, and student residences managed by the student housing cooperation DUWO.

Academic building
AUC has a main academic building in Science Park Amsterdam, where most classes are taught. In line with AUC's promise of small classes, the building does not have an auditorium; larger events take place in its common room area. Lecture rooms and study areas are spread over four levels, and teacher's rooms are notably located in areas accessible to students.

The AUC academic building, opened in 2012, was designed by Mecanoo architects. Its exterior appearance is dominated by a façade of rust-coloured steel plates. The interior design received praise in the media for its "open character". The building won the 2013 Amsterdam Architecture Prize, for "the simplicity of its shape [and] its surprising interior. A variety of different types of space with a range of educational functions meet, connect and merge under one substantial roof, which is spectacular and yet unobtrusive."

The architecture of the academic building emphasises environmental sustainability. The roof is planted with grass, increasing insulation and acting as a water storeroom. In combination with a geothermal heat pump, this serves to minimise energy loss and consumption.

Before moving to its current location, for the first three years of its existence AUC had a temporary academic building in the Plantage quarter, associated with the Roeterseiland location of the University of Amsterdam and opposite of the city's zoo, Artis.

Student residences

Students are required to maintain residence on campus for the whole duration of their studies. The student dorms are located on the Science Park campus in close proximity to AUC's academic building. The dorm buildings are administered by Dutch student housing specialist DUWO.

Science Park
The Science Park Amsterdam was initiated in 1996 as the location for a cluster of university buildings, research institutes and businesses. Next to AUC, the area also houses the University of Amsterdam Faculty of Sciences and several research institutes for physics, computer science, and mathematics. With two colocations of the Amsterdam Internet Exchange at the institutes SARA and Nikhef, the Science Park Amsterdam is one of the major Internet hubs in Europe.

The Amsterdam Science Park railway station connects the area to Amsterdam Central Station and Schiphol Airport in one direction and Almere in the other. A bus line connects the Science Park to Muiderpoort and Amstel railway stations.

Student life

As a small residential college, AUC has a close-knit student community. Parts of campus life are organised by student committees, although many activities take place in an informal framework. In particular Dutch students of AUC also participate in student organisations off campus, including fraternities at the University of Amsterdam and the traditional student rowing clubs, Nereus and Skøll.

Student body

AUC annually admits 300 students, most of whom join for the fall semester; though spring admission is possible. At the beginning of the year of 2013/14, enrollment was at about 750 students.

About 40% of student at Amsterdam University College come from abroad, roughly as many as come from the Netherlands (minority and foreign-educated Dutch students excluded). International students hail from more than 60 countries, though most are citizens of the European Union. In addition, in 2012/13, 12% of AUC students had a Dutch minority background. AUC has stated its aim to raise the minority population to 20% by means of scholarships and increased outreach to high schools.

Student organisation

Student activities at AUC are mostly organised under the umbrella of the Amsterdam University College Student Association. Each student which goes to AUC is automatically a member. Each student is allowed to suggest their own committee, which can take responsibility for organising activities. There is a broad range of committees with 29 different committees which currently fall under the AUCSA. The AUCSA was founded in 2010, one year after AUC. Since then each year the Board members are elected at a General Assembly, where all students can vote. 

The AUCSA Board is supported by a number of commissions that aim to improve the community, such as the Diversity Commission, Audit Commission, Sustainability Commission and the Acquisitions Commission. 

On top of this there are also teams that organise larger events throughout the year. Examples of this are the Winter Formal and Dormfest. Dormfest is held annually in the Courtyard of the AUC Dorms. Both current students of AUC and Alumni have free access to the event held in June.

Student politics

Until the academic year 2012/13, students were represented by the elected five-member Student Council responsible for administrative matters, as well as three non-elected student members (alongside three faculty members) on the Board of Studies, with an advisory function on academic matters. As of 2012/13, Student Council and Board of Studies have undergone an experimental merger, forming a College Council with five representatives of student body and faculty each. A further student representative on the Board of AUC fulfills a non-voting supervisory function.

Notable alumni

 Aaron Altaras, German actor (class of 2017)
 Katharina Andresen, Norwegian billionaire heiress (class of 2018)

References

External links
Amsterdam University College

Education in Amsterdam
Educational institutions established in 2008
Liberal arts colleges
Liberal arts colleges at universities in the Netherlands
Universities in the Netherlands
2008 establishments in the Netherlands